Bhairavi (Hindi: भैरवी, Sindhi: راڳ ڀيروي, Bengali: ভৈরবী) is a Hindustani Classical heptatonic (Sampurna) raga of Bhairavi thaat. In Western musical terms, raga Bhairavi employs the notes of the Phrygian mode, one of the traditional European church modes. Many Indians growing up during 1980s and 1990s will instantly recognize raag Bhairavi as it is the dominant note in popular Doordarshan video 'Mile sur mera tumhara'.

Theory

Raga Bhairavi is often referred to as the queen of morning Ragas. It produces a rich, devotional atmosphere especially suitable for the genres of Bhajan and the light classical form of Thumri. The Rishabh and Dhaivat used here are oscillating which is strongly recommended in this Raga and it makes the Raag mood intense.

Rishabh and Pancham are occasionally skipped in Aaroh like: S G m d P or G m d N S'. But in Avroh, Rishabh and Pancham are Deergh like S' N d P or P m G m r r S. In Avroh, Gandhar is skipped like: G m r S. Madhyam is an important note.

Arohana & Avarohana

Arohana : Sa   Ma Pa   Ṡa
Avarohana : Ṡa   Pa Ma   Sa

Vadi & Samavadi
Vadi : ma
Samavadi : sa

Variants 
The rich culture of Bhairavi being the closing Raga for any formal performance has produced, also, many newly explored shades of the Raga:
 Shuddha Bhairavi (Bhairavi with no deviations from the prescribed notes and movements)
 Sindhu Bhairavi (added Shuddha Dha)
 Jangla Bhairavi

References
Bor, Joep (ed). Rao, Suvarnalata; der Meer, Wim van; Harvey, Jane (co-authors) The Raga Guide: A Survey of 74 Hindustani Ragas. Zenith Media, London: 1999.

External links
 Detailed analysis and audio samples of Bhairavi from Rajan Parrikar Music Archive
 SRA on Samay and Ragas
 SRA on Ragas and Thaats
 More details about raag Bhairavi

Hindustani ragas